Waldo paucitentaculatus is a species of bivalve.

The species was described in 2013. It is also widely distributed.

References

Galeommatidae